Chloropsina is a genus of flies in the family Chloropidae.

Species 
Chloropsina acuticornis Deeming, 1981
Chloropsina affulgens Deeming, 1981
Chloropsina amabile (Frey, 1923)
Chloropsina ambigua (Frey, 1923)
Chloropsina angolensis Deeming, 1981
Chloropsina angustigenis (Becker, 1912)
Chloropsina ater (Duda, 1934)
Chloropsina bipunctifrons (Meijere, 1913)
Chloropsina brunnescens (Andersson, 1977)
Chloropsina citrivora Sabrosky, 1976
Chloropsina coelestifrons (Frey, 1923)
Chloropsina collessi Spencer, 1986
Chloropsina completa (Becker, 1913)
Chloropsina costale (Malloch, 1931)
Chloropsina crassipalpis Deeming, 1981
Chloropsina deemingi Ismay, 1996
Chloropsina delicata Becker, 1911
Chloropsina difficilis (Malloch, 1931)
Chloropsina distinguenda (Frey, 1909)
Chloropsina distinguendus (Frey, 1909)
Chloropsina elegans (Bezzi, 1914)
Chloropsina enigma Deeming & Al-Dhafer, 2012
Chloropsina flavovaria Becker, 1916
Chloropsina gingerensis Spencer, 1986
Chloropsina gugae Deeming, 1981
Chloropsina ilaroensis Deeming, 1981
Chloropsina koongarrensis Spencer, 1986
Chloropsina kurilensis (Nartshuk, 1973)
Chloropsina lacreiventris (Lamb, 1917)
Chloropsina leucochaeta Meijere, 1913
Chloropsina litoralis Deeming, 1981
Chloropsina lucens (Becker, 1910)
Chloropsina mallochi (Sabrosky, 1955)
Chloropsina mambillaensis Deeming, 1981
Chloropsina medleri Deeming, 1981
Chloropsina minima Becker, 1911
Chloropsina minus (Malloch, 1931)
Chloropsina nigerrima (Becker, 1913)
Chloropsina nigricollis (Frey, 1923)
Chloropsina nitens (Lamb, 1917)
Chloropsina nuda (Becker, 1913)
Chloropsina obscura Spencer, 1986
Chloropsina ochrifrons Deeming, 1981
Chloropsina oculata Becker, 1911
Chloropsina pallipes Spencer, 1986
Chloropsina poecilogaster (Becker, 1913)
Chloropsina polita Becker, 1911
Chloropsina pulicaria Ismay, 1999
Chloropsina punctifacialis Deeming, 1981
Chloropsina queenslandensis Spencer, 1986
Chloropsina rhombata (Kanmiya, 1978)
Chloropsina rohaceki Nartshuk, 2000
Chloropsina ruandana Deeming, 1981
Chloropsina rubrostriata (Duda, 1934)
Chloropsina simile (Malloch, 1931)
Chloropsina stubbsi Deeming, 1981
Chloropsina sulcicornis Deeming, 1981
Chloropsina sumatrana (Duda, 1934)
Chloropsina sydneyensis (Malloch, 1938)
Chloropsina sylvatica Deeming, 1981
Chloropsina tagalica (Frey, 1923)
Chloropsina tatabua Deeming, 1981
Chloropsina tibiale (Malloch, 1931)
Chloropsina triangularis (Malloch, 1931)
Chloropsina turneri Spencer, 1986
Chloropsina varia (Becker, 1913)
Chloropsina varley (Ismay, 1999)
Chloropsina varleyi Ismay, 1999
Chloropsina vesicata Deeming, 1981

 Names brought to synonymy
 Chloropsina nigrohalteratum, synonym of Melanum nigrohalteratum

References

External links 
 Chloropsina at faunaeur.org
 Chloropsina at nearctica.com
 Chloropsina at insectoid.info

Chloropinae
Chloropidae genera
Taxa named by Theodor Becker